Chris Haggard and Ivo Karlović were the defending champions, but Karlovic chose not to participate, and only Haggard competed that year.
Haggard partnered with James Auckland, but lost in the first round to Simon Aspelin and Robert Lindstedt.

Eric Butorac and Jamie Murray won in the final 7–5, 6–3, against Julian Knowle and Jürgen Melzer.

Seeds

Draw

Draw

External links
Draw

2007 Regions Morgan Keegan Championships and the Cellular South Cup
Regions Morgan Keegan Championships